El Canelo may refer to

 Canelo, a ship that sank as result of the 1960 Valdivia earthquake in Chile
 "El Canelo", a song by Los Lobos on their 1988 album: La Pistola y El Corazón

See also 
 Canelo (disambiguation)